Sadabad District is in Dashtestan County, Bushehr province, Iran. At the 2006 census, its population was 31,928 in 6,772 households. The following census in 2011 counted 33,272 people in 8,389 households. At the latest census in 2016, the district had 33,513 inhabitants living in 9,568 households.

References 

Districts of Bushehr Province
Populated places in Dashtestan County